Bear Mountain Ski Hill is a ski area located on the outskirts of Dawson Creek, British Columbia, Canada.  It was built in 1959 and has a T-Bar and ten runs (beginner to intermediate).  It is operated by the Bear Mountain Ski and Recreation Club.  It is in the same vicinity as a large cross-country ski trail network operated by the Bear Mountain Nordic Ski Association.

The slope has 10 runs (Main, Bradford, West, Havards, Big Bear, Knox, Old Road, Easy Way Down, Bobs Run and the Chute), a terrain park and 7 cross-country ski trails.

References

External links
Bear Mountain Ski Hill Official Web Site
Discover the Peace Country website
Northern BC Ski Hills & Resorts, WorldWeb.com site

Peace River Country
Ski areas and resorts in British Columbia